Richard Whitley is an American screenwriter, producer, lyricist, and actor best known for his work on Rock 'n' Roll High School.

Career 
Richard Whitley was born in Elmhurst, Illinois, to Marian and Edward F. Whitley. He had an older half-brother, John Hill, who was a game designer. Whitley began his career by writing the script for Roger Corman's Rock 'n' Roll High School (1979). His work on Rock 'n' Roll High School led to writing for several TV shows, including Delta House, Homefront, TV Nation, Space: Above and Beyond, Roseanne, Millennium, Recess, Roswell, The Others, Lloyd in Space, Canterbury's Law, and Pound Puppies. On July 31, 2008, it was announced that actor/writer Alex Winter had been hired to script a remake of Rock 'n' Roll High School for Howard Stern's production company.

Filmography

Film

Television

References

External links 
 

20th-century American comedians
20th-century American male writers
20th-century American screenwriters
21st-century American comedians
21st-century American male writers
21st-century American screenwriters
American comedy writers
American male screenwriters
American male television writers
American television writers
Living people
People from Elmhurst, Illinois
Screenwriters from Illinois
Year of birth missing (living people)